Bhaurao Datar (14 January 1903 − 15 September 1982) was an Indian silent film actor, popularly known for his role as the 17th century Maratha king Shivaji.

Early life 
Krishnaji Vishwanath Datar alias Bhaurao Datar was born on 14 January 1903 in a rich family which soon experienced a sudden financial downfall and was forced to move to Nasik, Maharashtra for better life. There his father started a tea stall near Vijayanand theatre. While helping his father to serve tea, young Datar observed renowned actors like Master Dinanath and Bal Gandharva and was attracted towards acting and learned the first lesson of acting.

With growing age, he joined a local gymnasium and soon became a wrestler and won many medals in Nasik Akhada. His well built physique and attractive personality gave him first chance to work in Dadasaheb Phalke's studio. His personal life and noted contribution in about 80 films as a lead actor have been recorded in Datar family history book named Datar Kulvrutant (1974)

Personal life 
Bhaurao Datar married twice. His first wife was Kashi Bilwalkar and he had three daughters from his first marriage. After death of his first wife, he married Anusuya Vaidya and had one son and two daughters from his second wife.

Film career 
Hero of Dadasaheb Phalke's silent movies.

Datar started his career in the era of silent films. He was associated with Phalke studio and acted in over 80 non talkie Marathi films, 20 talkie Marathi films and one Hindi film.

1922-1928 
Out of Dadasaheb's 119 movies, 80 were made between 1918 and 1928. It is worth mentioning that out of 80 movies, 60 had Bhaurao Datar in different roles. He also acted in silent and talkie films with other renowned directors like Nanasaheb Sarpotdar, Master Vinayak and Bhalji Pendharkar. He acted in silent films but his performances were so lively that one used to be simply mesmerized.

1928-1933 
After leaving Dadasaheb's company in Nasik, he set off to Nanasaheb Sarpotdar's company in Pune known as Aryan Company. He performed brilliantly in 15 out of 20 films made her. His role as ‘Thaksen’ in Prince Thaksen, Samsher in Samsher Bahaddar (Brave Samsher), Dr. Madan in Good Bye Marriage, Ramdas in Bhavani Talwar etc. were highly appreciated. With Lalita Pawar, he had many silent films like Dashrathi Ram, Subhadra haran, Chatur Sundari, Thakay Maushi, Samsher Bahadur and Prithviraj Sanyogita. They also worked together in ‘Duniya Kya hai’ and ‘Netaji Palkar’ later.

1933-1936 
In 1933, he left Pune to enter into dazzling world of Mumbai's film industry. Ardeshir Irani's film company welcomed him. Here he played various roles in talkie films like Rukmini haran, Chalta Putla, Prithviraj Sanyukta and Devki. His role as a mentally challenged prince in ‘Chalta Putla’ was highly appreciated and famous.

1937-1944 
He acted in Dharmaveer, Chimukla Sansar, Mazhe Bal of Master Vinayak, Netaji Palkar of Sir Bhalji Pendharkar

Immortal Shivaji of film industry 
Dadasaheb Phalke first brought Shri Datar to the screen in his silent movie ‘Agryahoon Sutka’ (1929) in the role of Shivaji. Later in the era of talkies too, he made name in that role. He was known for his Shivaji role and even statue of Shivaji of Raigad made by Shri Patkar and Shri Sahastrabuddhe Guruji was made by taking all the measurements and look of Shri Bhaurao Datar byasking him to sit in front of them for hours together. The statue of Shivaji is in itself a great memory of Bhaurao Datar's role as Shivaji in the film industry.

Makeup 
Bhaurao's career as an actor did not last in the modern era of Indian cinema. But soon he was known as Dada Datar, the make up magician. A versatile actor and also a makeup artist, this was a unique combination Dada Datar had in him. After getting over with the career of an actor, Bhaurao took up a job with Mukherjee's filmalaya. Now he was called as Dada Datar and he rendered his service as a makeup master in many Hindi films. He was the most popular makeup artist and was creator of widely famous ‘Sadhana Cut’.

Documentary film 
A documentary film on Bhaurao Datar by his grand son Mr. Bharat Kanhere, exfaculty of Cinematography FTII, Pune will be shortly released. This film is specially made to honour Bhaurao Datar and many others who have valuable contribution to the film industry but did not get enough recognition. This film is about an outstanding contribution of a multitalented artist ‘Bhaurao Datar’ to Indian film industry.

List of silent Marathi movies

List of talkie Marathi movies

List of films (as makeup director) 
	1937 Dharmaveer 
	1943 Chimukala sansar 
	1944 Gajabhau 
	1962 Ek musafir Ek Hasina 
	1963 Yeh Rastey hen pyar ke 
	Alif Laila 
	Love in Simla 
	Halaku 
	Khazanchi 
	Neelofer 
	Chor Bazar 
	Sitra

References

External links

Indian male silent film actors
1903 births
1982 deaths
People from Satara (city)
Indian male sport wrestlers